Domingo Cisma González (born 9 February 1982) is a Spanish retired footballer who played as a left back, currently assistant manager of FC Cartagena.

He appeared in 182 La Liga matches over eight seasons, totalling five goals for Almería, Numancia, Racing de Santander, Atlético Madrid and Elche.

Playing career
Born in Seville, Andalusia, Cisma played for Ayamonte CF and Atlético Madrid B during his early career. For 2005–06 he signed with UD Almería of the Segunda División, contributing 20 games the following season (scoring in a 2–1 win at Elche CF) as the Andalusia club promoted to La Liga for the first time ever.

Moving to recently promoted CD Numancia in July 2008, on loan, Cisma netted his first top-flight goal on 26 October, in the 96th minute, for a 2–1 home victory over Racing de Santander. He was first choice throughout the relegation-ending campaign.

Cisma then returned to Almería, where he finally became a starter, even appearing as a central defender on occasion due to the many injuries that ravaged the back sector; the team managed to retain their league status. In late May 2010, however, his link expired and a new deal was not arranged, with the player eventually leaving for Racing Santander on a four-year contract.

On 28 August 2012, after having already started the second-division season with the Cantabrians, Cisma agreed on a return to Atlético Madrid, signing as a free agent for one year. He subsequently represented Elche CF and Córdoba CF – the first side in the top flight and the latter in division two– before retiring in 2017 due to injuries.

Coaching career
On 16 February 2018, Cisma was appointed manager of Morón CF in the Andalusia regional leagues. In January 2021, he joined Luis Carrión's coaching staff at second-tier FC Cartagena.

Honours
Atlético Madrid
Copa del Rey: 2012–13

References

External links
Racing Santander official profile 

1982 births
Living people
Footballers from Seville
Spanish footballers
Association football defenders
La Liga players
Segunda División players
Segunda División B players
Tercera División players
Atlético Madrid B players
UD Almería players
CD Numancia players
Racing de Santander players
Atlético Madrid footballers
Elche CF players
Córdoba CF players
Spanish football managers